Adam Brown Littlepage (April 14, 1859 – June 29, 1921) was a lawyer and Democratic politician from West Virginia who served as a  United States Representative. Congressman Littlepage was born near Charleston, West Virginia, in Kanawha County  (then in Virginia) on April 14, 1859. He served as a member of the 62nd, 64th, and 65th United States Congresses.  He died in Charleston, June 29, 1921.

He attended the common schools, studied law, and was admitted to the bar. He entered practice in Newport, Indiana, in 1882. He returned to Charleston in 1884 and continued the practice of law. He served the United Mine Workers Association in West Virginia as general counsel. From 1906 to 1910, he served as a member of the West Virginia Senate.

He was elected from West Virginia's 3rd District as a Democrat to the Sixty-second Congress (March 4, 1911 – March 3, 1913). His candidacy for re-election to the Sixty-third Congress in 1912 was unsuccessful. He returned to serve from West Virginia's 3rd District in the Sixty-fourth and Sixty-fifth Congresses (March 4, 1915 – March 3, 1919). He was an unsuccessful candidate for re-election in 1918 to the  Sixty-sixth Congress and returned to his law practice. He died in Charleston on June 29, 1921, and was interred there at Spring Hill Cemetery.

See also
List of United States representatives from West Virginia
United States congressional delegations from West Virginia

References

External links

1859 births
1921 deaths
Burials at Spring Hill Cemetery (Charleston, West Virginia)
Politicians from Charleston, West Virginia
United Mine Workers people
West Virginia lawyers
Democratic Party West Virginia state senators
Democratic Party members of the United States House of Representatives from West Virginia
Lawyers from Charleston, West Virginia
19th-century American lawyers